The 1997 AFC Women's Championship was a women's football tournament held in the province Guangdong, China between 5 and 14 December 1997. It was the 11th staging of the AFC Women's Championship.
The 1997 AFC Women's Championship, consisting of eleven teams, served as the AFC's qualifying tournament for the 1999 FIFA Women's World Cup. Asia's three berths were given to the two finalists - China and Korea DPR - and the winner of the third place play-off, Japan.

Group stage

Group A

Group B

Group C

Knockout stage

Semi-finals
Winners qualified for 1999 FIFA Women's World Cup

Third place match
Winner qualified for 1999 FIFA Women's World Cup

Final

Awards

Goalscorers

External links
 Tables & results at RSSSF.com

Women's Championship
AFC Women's Championship
AFC Women's Asian Cup tournaments
AFC Women's Championship
1997
Afc
AFC Women's Championship
AFC Championship